Daisy Shah (born 25 August 1984) is an Indian actress, model and dancer who primarily appears in Hindi and Kannada films. She has worked as an assistant to choreographer Ganesh Acharya. Her first breakthrough came when she was selected to play the lead role in the 2011 Kannada film Bhadra. She then appeared opposite Salman Khan in the 2014 Hindi film Jai Ho. In 2015, she was a part of Hate Story 3.

Early life
Shah belongs to a Gujarati family, but was born and brought up in Mumbai, Maharashtra. Shah won the Miss Photogenic award in the MS Dombivli contest at a local mall when she was in 10th class. She studied arts at Mumbai's Khalsa College.

Career
Shah worked as an assistant to choreographer Ganesh Acharya in films like Zameen and Khakee and later started modelling, doing photo shoots and print ads. Kannada director Harsha approached her for the film Chingari. She played Ammu in the Kannada version of Bodyguard. She then shot for two item songs in the Kannada film Bachchan and the Hindi film Bloody Isshq. She also did an item song ("Neeli Lugadi") in the Hindi film Khuda Kasam, starring Sunny Deol and Tabu. In 2014, Shah acted in the commercially successful Jai Ho opposite Salman Khan. She portrayed Sanjana in the 2018 film Race 3.

Filmography

Films

Awards and nominations

See also 

 List of Hindi film actresses

References

External links 

 
 
 

1984 births
Living people
Actresses from Mumbai
Indian film actresses
Actresses in Hindi cinema
Actresses in Malayalam cinema
Actresses in Tamil cinema
21st-century Indian actresses
Gujarati people
Actresses in Gujarati cinema
Actresses in Kannada cinema
Indian Hindus